Dr Richard (Rick) Agnew (born 1959) is an Australian alpine mountaineer and high altitude sports aviator who has completed the Seven Summits (climbing the highest mountains on each of the seven continents) climbing Mount Everest and many other peaks. He holds over 40 international and Australian speed, distance and height aviation records.

Mountaineering
Agnew is the oldest Australian and first Canberran to have climbed the highest mountains on each of the seven continents in a feat known as the Seven Summits.

Agnew's interest in climbing was prompted by the climbing activities of his oldest brother, Brian Agnew, who was instrumental in forming the Australian Army Alpine Association (AAA) who led, co-led and/or participated in climbing expeditions throughout the 1980-90s, primarily in the Himalayas, including the Australian Bicentennial Everest Expedition. Other AAA members also included Pat Cullinan SC, OAM, Jon Muir OAM and Zac Zaharias CSM.

Agnew has been climbing seriously since 2000 and has climbed, guided and/or co-guided on all seven continents. Expeditions include climbs in New Zealand and throughout South America, including the technically demanding Mount Fitzroy , Patagonia, Argentina, volcanos in Ecuador and many peaks in Argentina, Chile, Peru and throughout the European Alps, prior to climbing in the Himalayas.

On an expedition to Aconcagua , Argentina in 2007, Agnew was part of a team led by Jon Muir  when it became apparent that Muir had succumbed to altitude sickness and couldn't continue to guide the team. At high camp, the famed Viento Blanco (white wind) caused all climbing teams at height to attempt an evacuation. One of Agnew's fellow team members experienced life-threatening High-Altitude Pulmonary Edema (HAPE), needing immediate evacuation down the mountain and subsequently airlifted to Mendoza hospital. Agnew was left to lead the remaining team member's survival throughout a deadly night (including a tent fire and a death close by) at high camp. The retreat down the mountain the next day was memorable to Aconcagua's base camp which was also devastated and many teams lost the majority of their equipment.

After many successful summits throughout the world (North and South America, the Andes and in the Alps), Agnew was one of six Australians and two Britons who made it to the summit of Mount Everest on 25 May 2010,  with an expedition led by South Australian Duncan Chessell. Agnew finished the last of the Seven Summits with Mount Vinson, Antarctica in December 2014, becoming the first Canberran and oldest Australian to do so.

Agnew's climbing continues with a successful speed ascent of the technical Ama Dablam  in Nov 2015, climbing back up from the precarious Camp 2 to rescue a young Australian; and an attempt on Shishapangma  in May 2016 and a successful ascent on the eighth highest mountain in the world Mt Manaslu, Agnew being the oldest Australian to do so in Sept 2018. A massive avalanche stopped Agnew from a successful summit of the world's second highest mountain, K2  in Pakistan. On 17 July 2019 Agnew on the Abruzzi route was halted at the end of the famous Bottleneck's narrow couloir, reaching 8,350 m of K2's 8,611 m altitude.

Gliding
Agnew trained with several Australian gliding clubs, soloing with the Canberra Gliding Club prior to his officer and pilot training with the Royal Australian Air Force.
Agnew is a three diamond badged pilot (Dec 1992) who has achieved the Australian altitude record in a glider when he reached  in 1995. He achieved his 1,000 km Fédération Aéronautique Internationale (FAI) &  diploma on 25 Nov 2005.

Agnew is the winner of the Gliding Federation of Australia’s annual Martin Warner Trophy, for highest height gain, winning 17 times in the last twenty years. Agnew has over 40 International and Australian speed, distance & height records.

Agnew is a graduate of the Australian National University, obtaining a BSc(Forestry) in between bushwalking and learning to fly gliders. He undertook officer and pilot training with the Royal Australian Air Force (RAAF), is a graduate of the Australian Defence Force Academy (Masters in Defense Studies), and University of Canberra (Master's in Public Administration and a Doctorate in risk management). Agnew holds a post-graduate qualification in aviation medicine from Monash University.

When not summiting peaks, Agnew presents on the risk management aspects of high altitude activities, as well as other aspects of governance, assurance organisational resilience and risk management – having run public and private sector governance, assurance and risk management areas within PricewaterhouseCoopers, Deloittes, Aurecon and with government. Agnew is the managing director of Business Assurance Australia.

References

External links

 Business Assurance Australia

Living people
Australian mountain climbers
Australian summiters of Mount Everest
Summiters of the Seven Summits
1959 births